Laminin subunit alpha-2 is a protein that in humans is encoded by the LAMA2 gene.

Function 

Laminin, an extracellular matrix protein, is a major component of the basement membrane. It is thought to mediate the attachment, migration, and organization of cells into tissues during embryonic development by interacting with other extracellular matrix components. It is composed of three subunits, alpha, beta, and gamma, which are bound to each other by disulfide bonds into a cross-shaped molecule. This gene encodes the alpha 2 chain, which constitutes one of the subunits of laminin 2 (merosin) and laminin 4 (s-merosin). Mutations in this gene have been identified as the cause of congenital merosin-deficient muscular dystrophy. Two transcript variants encoding different proteins have been found for this gene.

References

Further reading

External links
  GeneReviews/NCBI/NIH/UW entry on Congenital Muscular Dystrophy Overview
 LOVD mutation database: LAMA2
 

Laminins